The CourseManagement Open Service Interface Definition (OSID) is an O.K.I. specification which supports the creation and management of a course catalog (CourseCatalog). OSIDs are programmatic interfaces which comprise a service-oriented architecture for designing and building reusable and interoperable software.

The CourseCatalog is organized into:

 CanonicalCourses describe general courses of study and exist across academic terms.
 CourseOfferings describe an offering of a CanonicalCourse during a specific academic term.
 CourseSections describe a meeting of a CourseOffering including location, scheduling and membership information.

When used in concert, the OSIDs comprise a complete system with each service focused exclusively on a particular area. For example, the roles related to a CourseOffering are defined through the Authorization OSID, course work and materials can be defined in the Repository OSID, and course grades are assigned through the Grading OSID. This factoring of the problem space allows for different implementations of each of these services to be used independently from each other within the same Course Management software package.

See also
Course management system

External links
OSID v2.0 CourseManagement Documentation (PDF)

Software architecture